Minuscule 332 (in the Gregory-Aland numbering), A209 (Soden), is a Greek minuscule manuscript of the New Testament, on parchment. Paleographically it has been assigned to the 12th century. 
According to Gregory the 11th century is also possible.  It has marginalia.

Description 

The codex contains the text of the four Gospels on 304 parchment leaves. The text is written in one column per page, in 33 lines per page.

Kurt Aland did not place the Greek text of the codex in any Category. It was not examined by using the Claremont Profile Method.

History 

The manuscript was bound in 1258. It was added to the list of New Testament manuscripts by Scholz (1794-1852).
C. R. Gregory saw it in 1886.

The manuscript is currently housed at the Turin National University Library (C. II. 4) in Turin.

See also 

 List of New Testament minuscules
 Biblical manuscript
 Textual criticism
 Minuscule 333

References

Further reading 

 Giuseppe Pasino, Codices manuscripti Bibliothecae Regii Taurinensis Athenaei, Turin 1742, Teil 2.

External links 
 

Greek New Testament minuscules
12th-century biblical manuscripts